Monica Howe is a British costume designer, who made her film debut in 1976 with Bugsy Malone, for which she received a BAFTA Award for Best Costume Design nomination at the 31st British Academy Film Awards. She was again nominated in 2001 for her work on the Academy Award-nominated film O Brother, Where Art Thou?.

References

External links

British costume designers
Living people
Year of birth missing (living people)